Lester Ferrer Salansang (born July 3, 1985), known professionally as Lester Llansang, is a Filipino actor who appeared in the film Saranggola when he was 14 years old. He plays the role of a schoolboy who witnessed a crime committed by his policeman father. He was awarded Best Child Actor in FAMAS for this role. He also appeared in the movie Ang Galing-galing Mo, Babes.

Early life
Llansang is the youngest offspring of Danilo Salansang and Jemmalyn Ferrer. He was born on July 3, 1985 and is the sibling of Windilou and Cindy. He then grew up with his grandfather Carlos and later with his grandmother Virginia Salansang.

Career
In 1994 he starred in Pedro Penduko as Juan and in 1999, Llansang appeared in film Saranggola. In 2012 Llansang is the horror film Shake, Rattle and Roll Fourteen: The Invasion. From 2015 until 2020, Llansang is cast in the television series FPJ's Ang Probinsyano as Mark Vargas.

Filmography

Film

Television series 

 Suntok sa Buwan - Warden Bennie (2022 / TV5)
 Wansapanataym: Amazing Ving – Police Officer (2017 / ABS-CBN)
 Ipaglaban Mo!: Kapalit ng Pag-ibig - Noel (2015 / ABS-CBN)
 FPJ's Ang Probinsyano – PS Insp. Mark Vargas (2015–2020 / ABS-CBN, Kapamilya Channel)
 Nathaniel – Dexter Malgapo (2015 / ABS-CBN)
 Magpakailanman: Love Me for What I Am – Teacher Marvin (2015 / GMA Network)
 Magpakailanman: Ang Babaeng may Dalawang Buhay – Engr. Mike (2014 / GMA Network)
 Regal Shocker – Bukaw (2012 / TV5)
 Real Confessions – Various Roles (2010–2011 / TV5)
 Wag Kukurap – Noel (2005 / GMA Network)
 Magpakailanman: Laban sa Magandang Kinabukasan – Ernesto (2005 / GMA Network)
 Leya, ang Pinakamagandang Babae sa Ilalim ng Lupa – Aries (2004 / GMA Network)
 Ang Iibigin ay Ikaw (2002 / GMA Network)
 Click – Booj (1999 / GMA Network)
 Maalaala Mo Kaya - Various Roles (1992–2018 / ABS-CBN)

References

Living people
1985 births
Place of birth missing (living people)
20th-century Filipino male actors
21st-century Filipino male actors
Filipino male child actors
Filipino male film actors
Filipino male television actors
Male actors from Manila